Roman candle may refer to:
 Roman candle (firework), a traditional type of firework
 Roman Candle (album), a 1994 album by Elliott Smith
 Roman Candle (band), band from Chapel Hill, NC 
 Roman Candles (1966 film), a short film by John Waters
 Roman Candles (1920 film), a silent film drama directed by Jack Pratt
 Roman Candle (Portland, Oregon), a defunct bakery and pizzeria in the United States
 Nero's Torches